Zdzisław Szubski (born 26 January 1958 in Grudziądz) is a Polish sprint canoer who competed in the late 1970s and early 1980s. He won four medals in the K-4 10000 m at the ICF Canoe Sprint World Championships with three silvers (1978, 1979, 1981) and a bronze (1977). He represent club Astoria Bydgoszcz. Father of Sebastian Szubski.

Szubski also finished seventh in the K-2 500 m event at the 1980 Summer Olympics in Moscow.

References

Sports-reference.com profile

1958 births
Canoeists at the 1980 Summer Olympics
Astoria Bydgoszcz members
Living people
Olympic canoeists of Poland
Polish male canoeists
People from Grudziądz
ICF Canoe Sprint World Championships medalists in kayak
Sportspeople from Kuyavian-Pomeranian Voivodeship